Katalin Éva Veresné Novák (born 6 September 1977) is a Hungarian politician serving as the current president of Hungary, having been elected in the 2022 presidential election. Novák is the first woman to hold the presidency, as well as the youngest president in the history of Hungary, elected at the age of 44. A member of Fidesz, Novák has additionally served as member of the National Assembly from 2018 to 2022, and as Minister for Family Affairs in the fourth Orbán Government from 2020 until 2021.

Education
After completing her secondary education at the Ságvári Endre Secondary School at Szeged in 1996, Novák studied economics at the Corvinus University of Budapest and law at the University of Szeged. While a student, she additionally studied abroad at the Paris Nanterre University. In addition to Hungarian, Novák speaks French, English, and German.

Career

Novák started work at the Foreign Ministry in 2001, specializing in European Union and European matters. In 2010 she became a ministerial advisor and in 2012 was appointed Head of Cabinet of the Ministry of Human Resources.

In 2014 she became State Secretary for Family and Youth Affairs at the Ministry of Human Capacities, eventually becoming Minister of Family Affairs in October 2020, a position held until December 2021. 

She served as Vice President of Fidesz between 2017 and 2021.

On 21 December 2021, Prime Minister Viktor Orbán announced that Novák would be his nominee in the 2022 presidential election. On 10 March 2022, she won gaining 137 out of 188 votes in the National Assembly.

Personal life
Katalin Novák is married and has three children. Her husband is economist István Veres, director of the Financial Market and Foreign Exchange Market Directorate at the Hungarian National Bank (MNB). She is a Reformed Christian.

Honours and awards

Domestic 
  Hungarian Order of Saint Stephen (2022)According to the Constitution of Hungary's CCII/2011 law the president of Hungary receives the Hungarian Order of Saint Stephen ex-officio.
  Grand Cross with Chain of the Hungarian Order of MeritAccording to the Constitution of Hungary's CCII/2011 law the president of Hungary receives the Grand Cross with Chain of the Hungarian Order of Merit ex-officio.

Foreign
 : Knight (Chevalier) of the National Order of the Legion of Honour (2019)
 : Commander's Cross of the Order of Merit of the Republic of Poland (2019)
 : Grand Collar of the Order of Prince Henry (2023)

References

External links

|-

 
|-

|-

1977 births
Living people
People from Szeged
Presidents of Hungary
Fidesz politicians
Members of the National Assembly of Hungary (2018–2022)
Women members of the National Assembly of Hungary
Women government ministers of Hungary
Female heads of state
Women presidents
Corvinus University of Budapest alumni
University of Szeged alumni
Chevaliers of the Légion d'honneur
Commanders of the Order of Merit of the Republic of Poland
Hungarian Calvinist and Reformed Christians